Katrina Adams and Zina Garrison were the defending champions, but Garrison did not compete this year. Adams teamed up with Lori McNeil and lost in the semifinals to Gigi Fernández and Elizabeth Smylie.

Fernández and Smylie won the title by defeating Jo-Anne Faull and Rachel McQuillan 6–2, 6–2 in the final.

Seeds

Draw

Draw

References

External links
 Official results archive (ITF)
 Official results archive (WTA)

Toray Pan Pacific Open
Pan Pacific Open
1990 Toray Pan Pacific Open